The Postman Always Rings Twice is a 1946 American film noir based on the 1934 novel of the same name by James M. Cain. This adaptation of the novel features Lana Turner, John Garfield, Cecil Kellaway, Hume Cronyn, Leon Ames, and Audrey Totter. It was directed by Tay Garnett. The musical score was written by George Bassman and Erich Zeisl (the latter uncredited).

This version was the third filming of The Postman Always Rings Twice, but the first under the novel's original title and the first in English. Previously, the novel had been filmed as Le Dernier Tournant (The Last Turning) in France in 1939 and as Ossessione (Obsession) in Italy in 1943.

Plot

Frank Chambers is an amiable, restless drifter who has hitched a ride with local District Attorney Kyle Sackett. He drops Frank off at a rural diner/service station named "Twin Oaks", which is on a highway in the hills outside Los Angeles. Frank begins working there. The diner is operated by the stodgy Nick Smith and his beautiful, much younger wife, Cora.

Frank and Cora start to have an affair soon after they meet. Cora is tired of her situation, married to a man she does not love and working at a diner she wishes to own outright. While attempting to run away together, Cora concludes that if she divorces Nick, she will end up with nothing; she and Frank will be no further ahead. They return to Twin Oaks in time for her to retrieve the goodbye note she had left in the cash register for Nick. Cora talks Frank into murdering Nick for them to have the diner. The plan involves Cora striking Nick with a sock full of ball-bearings and pretending he had fatally hit his head falling in the bathtub. Things go awry when a police officer stops by, and a cat causes a power outage. Cora manages to knock Nick over the head and severely injures him.

The couple is thrilled when it is determined that Nick will be all right since no foul play is suspected, and he has no recollection of how he was struck. They share a happy week, running the business together and enjoying their relationship. The police officer stops by one day and tells Frank he passed Cora driving Nick back from the hospital. Frank sees no hope for a definite future with her, so he decides to move on before she returns. He goes to L.A.; after a couple of weeks, he starts hanging around the marketplace where Nick and Cora buy most of their produce, hoping to see her. He runs into Nick, who has been looking for him; Nick insists that Frank returns to Twin Oaks with him, saying, "something important's gonna happen tonight, and you're in on it."

Upon Frank's return, Cora behaves coolly toward him; the three of them have dinner together, and Nick announces that he will be selling Twin Oaks and that Cora and he will be moving in with his infirm sister in northern Canada. That night, Cora is desperate; Frank finds her in the kitchen with a knife she says she will use on herself. Frank agrees to kill Nick. The next day, the three of them are to drive to Santa Barbara to finalize the sale of Twin Oaks. Frank and Cora intend to stage a drunk driving accident. Sackett stops by to air his tire, and Frank and Cora stage an argument where she insists on driving due to the men's inebriation. On a deserted stretch of road, Frank kills Nick with a blow to the head and then sends the car off a cliff. However, Frank is also caught in the car and injured. Sackett, who followed them, arrives to find Cora crying for help.

The District Attorney files murder charges against only Cora, hoping to divide her and Frank. Although this ploy works temporarily, a clever measure by Cora's lawyer, Arthur Keats, prevents Cora's full confession from coming into the hands of the prosecutor. Cora secures a plea bargain in which she pleads guilty to manslaughter and receives probation.

Publicity from the murder makes Twin Oaks very successful, but things remain tense between Frank and Cora. They marry to protect themselves from being forced to testify against each other. When Cora leaves to care for her sick mother, Frank has a brief fling with a woman. After Cora returns, a man named Kennedy, who had worked as an investigator for her attorney, shows up and attempts to blackmail her with the confession. Frank beats up Kennedy and his partner and takes the signed confession from them.

Cora tells Frank that she knows about his affair. The two argue but reconcile, and Cora announces that she is pregnant. She speculates that the new life they have created may balance the one they took. They go to the beach and swim, realizing they still love each other. On the way back, Frank accidentally crashes the car and kills Cora.

Frank is tried and convicted for killing Cora. While on death row, he is visited by a priest and by District Attorney Sackett, who confronts him with the evidence of his involvement in Nick's murder and reasons that if he resists his legal fate in Cora's death that he'll only wind up back where he is with a conviction for Nick's murder. Frank accepts that, while he is innocent of Cora's death, his execution will be a fitting punishment for his murder of Nick. Frank muses that, just as the postman always rings a second time to make sure people receive their mail, fate has ensured that he and Cora have finally paid the price for their crime.

Cast
 Lana Turner as Cora Smith
 John Garfield as Frank Chambers
 Cecil Kellaway as Nick Smith
 Hume Cronyn as Arthur Keats
 Leon Ames as Kyle Sackett
 Audrey Totter as Madge Gorland
 Alan Reed as Ezra Liam Kennedy
 Jeff York as Blair
 Morris Ankrum as Judge Dudly Parkman (uncredited)
 Byron Foulger as Picnic Manager (uncredited)
 Frank Mayo as Bailiff (uncredited)

Production
In early February 1934, before Cain's novel was published, RKO executive Merian C. Cooper submitted a synopsis of his story to the Production Code Administration (PCA), which reviewed movie scripts using the Motion Picture Production Code (commonly known as the Hays Code). Upon reviewing the synopsis, with its themes of adultery and murder, the PCA persuaded RKO to abandon its plans to film Cain's story, calling it "definitely unsuitable for motion picture production."

After Cain's novel was released, Columbia Pictures and Warner Bros. expressed interest in the property, but Warner Bros. quickly rejected the story out of concerns that a film version would run afoul of censors. Metro-Goldwyn-Mayer purchased the rights to make a movie adaptation a full twelve years prior to the film's release. They didn't go forward with the project earlier as the Hays Code began to be rigorously enforced very shortly after they had acquired the rights. The studio finally decided to proceed in 1944, upon observing the success of Paramount's film adaptation of Cain's novella Double Indemnity, which violated many of the same moral taboos.

Lana Turner's character, Cora Smith, wore all white in every scene, except for three in which she wore all black: with the knife in the kitchen contemplating suicide, at the train station returning from her mother's death, and when she was calling the taxicab so she could leave Frank.

In 1936, Cain adapted his novel as a play, which had 72 performances at the Lyceum Theatre, in New York, from February to April 1936. The cast included Richard Barthelmess as Frank, Mary Philips as Cora, Joseph Greenwald as Nick and Dudley Clements as Sackett, with minor roles played by Joseph Cotten and Charles Halton.

Casting
Lana Turner was cast as Cora Smith. Turner said this was a favorite role of hers. Cain felt that she was the perfect choice for Cora and was so impressed with her performance that he presented her with a leather-bound copy of the novel inscribed "For my dear Lana, thank you for giving a performance that was even finer than I expected."

Joel McCrea was offered the role of Frank Chambers, but he turned it down. Gregory Peck was also considered for the role. John Garfield was borrowed from Warner Bros., and the veteran character actor Cecil Kellaway was borrowed from Paramount Studios and was cast as Nick, Cora's husband. When Turner found out that Garfield was cast as the male lead, she responded, "Couldn't they at least hire someone attractive?"

Filming

Tay Garnett, the director, wanted to film in as many actual locations as possible for the movie, a rarity for MGM at the time. For the seaside love scenes, he took the cast and crew to Laguna Beach, where a fog made shooting impossible for days. After a few days, they moved to San Clemente in search of clearer skies, only to have fog roll in there as well. Then word got to them that the fog had lifted at Laguna Beach. By the time they got back there, however, it had returned. The strain of waiting for the fog to lift caused Garnett, who had suffered from drinking problems in the past, to fall off the wagon. Garnett holed up in his hotel room, where nobody could get him to stop drinking. Concerned about rumours that he was going to be replaced, Garfield and Turner decided to visit him on their own. Garfield could get nowhere with him, but Turner managed to convince him to go back to Los Angeles for treatment. When he returned a week later, the fog lifted, and they all went back to work.

The on-set sexual tension between Garfield and Turner was clear to all involved with the film. Their first day together, he called out to her, "Hey, Lana, how's about a little quickie?" to which she replied, "You bastard!" They had a brief affair, according to the actor and director Vincent Sherman, a friend of Garfield's. Sherman said Turner was the only co-star with whom Garfield ever became romantically involved. There had been sparks between the two since the first day of shooting, and the delays had led to a close friendship. Finally, they shared a moonlit tryst on the beach, but it was their only night together. The two realized that whatever was happening on-screen, off-screen they had no sexual chemistry. They remained friends nonetheless.

As originally written in the novel, Madge was a lion tamer. Garnett even filmed the scene in which she introduces Frank to her cats. During shooting, a tiger sprayed the two stars, prompting John Garfield to jokingly ask for stunt pay.

Reception
The film was a major hit, earning $3,741,000 in the US and Canada and $1,345,000 elsewhere, recording a profit of $1,626,000. Despite this, Louis B. Mayer head of MGM, who always preferred more wholesome, family oriented pictures, hated it.

Critical response

Bosley Crowther, film critic of The New York Times, gave the film a positive review and lauded the acting and direction of the film, writing, "Too much cannot be said for the principals. Mr. Garfield reflects to the life the crude and confused young hobo who stumbles aimlessly into a fatal trap. And Miss Turner is remarkably effective as the cheap and uncertain blonde who has a pathetic ambition to 'be somebody' and a pitiful notion that she can realize it through crime. Cecil Kellaway is just a bit too cozy and clean as Miss Turner's middle-aged spouse. He is the only one not a Cain character, and throws a few scenes a shade out of key. But Hume Cronyn is slyly sharp and sleazy as an unscrupulous criminal lawyer, Leon Ames is tough as a district attorney and Alan Reed plays a gum-shoe role well."

Variety wrote that the two leads gave "the best of their talents" to their roles, but agreed with Crowther in finding Kellaway's performance "a bit flamboyant at times in interpreting the character." Harrison's Reports wrote that "the story is unconvincing, but it has been produced well and acted capably." John McCarten of The New Yorker wrote: "Since the hero and heroine of the film are never dealt with sympathetically, the mating calls that preface their amour are monotonous. But once they get around to murder, things pick up and I'm confident you'll enjoy the resulting legal byplay that goes on between Hume Cronyn, as Miss Turner's lawyer, and Leon Ames, as the prosecuting attorney. As a matter of fact, Mr. Cronyn and Mr. Ames take most of the acting honors, and there is a decided letdown in the picture after a courtroom clash in which both of them participate with vast enthusiasm."

Writing in 2000, critic Stephen MacMillan Moser appreciated Lana Turner's acting and wrote, "It is perhaps her finest work—from a body of work that includes very few truly stellar performances. She was a star, and not necessarily an actress, and because of that, so much of her work does not stand the test of time. She is best remembered for the spate of films like Peyton Place and Madame X that traded on her personal tragedies, but Postman, which predates all that, is a stunner—a cruel and desperate and gritty James Cain vehicle that sorely tests Lana's skills. But she succeeds marvelously, and from the first glimpse of her standing in the doorway in her white pumps, as the camera travels up her tanned legs, she becomes a character so enticingly beautiful and insidiously evil that the audience is riveted."

On Rotten Tomatoes, the film holds an approval rating of 89% based on 27 reviews, with an average of 8.00/10. The website's critical consensus reads, "The Postman Always Rings Twice spins a sultry web of mystery with a gripping adaptation of a classic noir tale."

The film, considered a classic example of film noir, showcases the distinctive features of the genre: the femme fatale, an alienated and tragic antihero figure and a mutual plot against the female character's husband. The story is narrated by the antihero in the form of a voiceover recollection of events past. The aesthetic quality of the film creates an atmosphere of disorientation, rejection of traditional morality and overall pessimistic tone.

Other adaptations
 Le Dernier Tournant (1939 French film) directed by Pierre Chenal
 Ossessione (1943 Italian film) directed by Luchino Visconti
 Cronaca di un Amore (1950 Italian film) directed by Michelangelo Antonioni
   Porto das Caixas (1962 Brazilian film) directed by Paulo Cesar Sarraceni
 The Postman Always Rings Twice (1981 film) directed by Bob Rafelson
 The Postman Always Rings Twice (1982 opera)
Szenvedély (1997 Hungarian film) directed by Fehér György
 Jerichow (2008 German film) directed by Christian Petzold (in German)

See also
 Payment Deferred—a 1926 novel and its 1932 film adaptation, which explore a similar theme.

References

External links 

 
 
 
 
 
 

 The Postman Always Rings Twice on Screen Guild Theater: June 16, 1947
 The Postman Always Rings Twice on Hollywood Sound Stage: January 24, 1952

1946 films
1946 crime drama films
Adultery in films
American black-and-white films
American crime drama films
1940s English-language films
Film noir
Films about capital punishment
Films based on mystery novels
Films based on works by James M. Cain
Films directed by Tay Garnett
Metro-Goldwyn-Mayer films
Films based on American novels
1940s American films